Gamini Atukorale (2 April 1951 – 1 January 2002) was the former Transport, Highways and Civil Aviation Minister in Sri Lanka and former General Secretary and Deputy Leader of United National Party.
Member of parliament Thalatha Atukorale is the sister of Gamini Atukorale.

Death
Atukorale died as a result of a cardiac arrest on 1 January 2002 at his residence in Ratnapura.
In 2005, UPFA Presidential candidate's election co-ordinator, former Minister Mangala Samaraweera alleged that Atukorale's death is suspicious and proposed a "Special Commission" to probe.

See also
List of political families in Sri Lanka

References

1952 births
2002 deaths
Sri Lankan Buddhists
Sinhalese lawyers
United National Party politicians
People from Ratnapura
Urban development ministers of Sri Lanka
Ministers of state of Sri Lanka
Non-cabinet ministers of Sri Lanka
Deputy ministers of Sri Lanka
Members of the 8th Parliament of Sri Lanka
Members of the 9th Parliament of Sri Lanka
Members of the 10th Parliament of Sri Lanka
Members of the 11th Parliament of Sri Lanka